Paul Cullen may refer to:

Paul Cullen (cardinal) (1803–1878), Irish archbishop 
Paul Cullen (general) (1909–2007), Australian soldier and grazier
Paul Cullen (rugby league) (born 1963), English rugby league coach and player
Paul Cullen (footballer) (1882–1950), Australian rules footballer
Paul Cullen, Lord Pentland (born 1957), Scottish judge and politician
Paul Cullen, bass guitarist with Bad Company
Paul Cullen, poisoned Treaty Oak (Austin, Texas)